Pentyl is a five-carbon alkyl group or substituent with chemical formula -C5H11. It is the substituent form of the alkane pentane.

In older literature, the common non-systematic name amyl was often used for the pentyl group.  Conversely, the name pentyl was used for several five-carbon branched alkyl groups, distinguished by various prefixes. The nomenclature has now reversed, with "amyl" being more often used to refer to the terminally branched group also called isopentyl, as in amobarbital.

A cyclopentyl group is a ring with the formula -C5H9.

The name is also used for the pentyl radical, a pentyl group as an isolated molecule. This free radical is only observed in extreme conditions.  Its formula is often written "•" or "• ⁠" to indicate that it has one unsatisfied valence bond.

Older "pentyl" groups 
The following names are still used sometimes:

Pentyl radical
The free radical pentyl was studied by J. Pacansky and A. Gutierrez in 1983. The radical was obtained by exposing bishexanoyl peroxide trapped in frozen argon to ultraviolet light, that caused its decomposition into two carbon dioxide molecules and two pentyl radicals.

Examples
 Pentanol
 Pentyl pentanoate
 Amylamine
 Amyl acetate
 Amyl alcohol
 Amylmetacresol
 Isoamyl acetate
 Isoamyl alcohol

References

Alkyl groups